Șerban Marinescu (born  27 May 1956) is a Romanian film director and screenwriter.

In December 2004 he was awarded by then-President of Romania Ion Iliescu the Order of Cultural Merit, Knight rank.

Selected filmography

References

External links
 

1956 births
Living people
People from Pitești
Romanian film directors
Romanian screenwriters
Recipients of the Order of Cultural Merit (Romania)